The Netherlands Society for Statistics and Operations Research (in Dutch Vereniging voor Statistiek en Operationele Research (VVS+OR)) is a Dutch professional association for Statistics and Operations Research. The society is a member of the European umbrella organization, the Association of European Operational Research Societies (EURO), and of the International Federation of Operational Research Societies (IFORS).

It was founded on August 15, 1945 as "Vereniging voor Statistiek". It aims to promote the study and the correct application of statistics and operations research and closely related parts of mathematics, in order to serve science and society.

The association provides several magazines and organizes conferences and other meetings in the field of mathematical statistics, the medical statistics and biostatistics, statistics in the social sciences, the psychometrics, the econometrics, and decision making.

The president of the Society is Fred van Eeuwijk. Among the previous presidents were Jaap Wessels (1993 - 1997) and Richard D. Gill (2007 - 2011), and Jacqueline J. Meulman(2011-2016).

Magazines  
The association publishes the magazines "Statistica Neerlandica" and since 2000 "STAtOR". The latter replaced the Gazette "VVS-Bulletin" which was last published in 1999.

References

External links  
 Netherlands Society of Statistics and Operations Research VVSOR Homepage

1945 establishments in the Netherlands
Organizations established in 1945
Scientific societies based in the Netherlands
Operations research societies
Professional associations based in the Netherlands